Ron Paul Family Cookbook (1995–present) is a family cookbook series published by Carol Paul, wife of American politician Ron Paul. The cookbooks serve the dual purpose as both a family cookbook and a political fundraiser for Ron Paul's political campaigns. It is more of a pamphlet with earlier versions running about 16 pages and later ones around 32 pages as new recipes are added.

The cookbooks have been reviewed in a Wall Street Journal video and article. It was also reviewed in Slate, The Week, The Seattle Times, The Boston Globe, The Daily Iowan, International Business Times, Smithsonian, and Fox News among other places.

Editions
1995 The Ron Paul Family Cookbook
1997 The Ron Paul Family Cookbook 
2000 The Ron Paul Family and Friends Cookbook 
2002 The Ron Paul Family Spring Cookbook
1999 The Ron Paul Family Holiday Cookbook
2009 The Ron Paul Family Cookbook 2009
2012 The Ron Paul Family Cookbook 2012

See also
 Ron Paul bibliography

References

External links
 Full text (2012 edition) at Internet Archive

Cookbooks
American political fundraisers
Family Cookbook